My New Time is the third studio album by the Dutch gothic metal band Autumn.

Track listing
"Satellites" - 4:32
"Closest Friends Conspire" - 3:49
"Blue Wine" - 4:28
"Angel of Desire" - 4:38
"My New Time" - 3:47
"Communication on Opium" - 4:39
"Twisted and Turned" - 4:18
"Shadowmancer" - 4:02
"Forget to Remember (Sunday Mornings)" - 4:41
"State of Mind" - 5:26
"Epilogue (What's Done Is Done)" - 4:05

Videos
The band shot a music video for the song "Satellites", under the supervision of the Dutch production company Wudenshu.

Charts

References

External links
 Autumn official website

2007 albums
Autumn (band) albums